Romolo Costa (26 February 1897 - 1 January 1965) was an Italian actor and voice actor.

Biography
Costa appeared in more than seventy films and television series between 1934 and 1964 and he was a character actor who generally appeared in supporting roles. Occasionally he played a more prominent role as in Il destino in tasca. He also worked extensively as a voice actor, dubbing foreign films for release in Italy. He served as a substitute for Emilio Cigoli as the Italian voice of Gary Cooper.

Selected filmography
 Pergolesi (1932)
 Steel (1933)
 Together in the Dark (1933)
 Loyalty of Love (1934)
 Like the Leaves (1935)
 Aldebaran (1935)
 The Joker King (1935)
 Bayonet (1936)
 The Ambassador (1936)
 I've Lost My Husband! (1937)
 Il signor Max (1937)
 Doctor Antonio (1937)
 Il destino in tasca (1938)
 They've Kidnapped a Man (1938)
 The Two Mothers (1938)
 Departure (1938)
 The Knight of San Marco (1939)
 Heartbeat (1939)
 Two Million for a Smile (1939)
 Backstage (1939)
 Marionette (1939)
 Diamonds (1939)
 The Faceless Voice (1939)
 Eternal Melodies (1940)
 Beyond Love (1940)
 A Husband for the Month of April (1941)
 A Pistol Shot (1942)
 Rossini (1942)
 Songs in the Streets (1950)

References

External links

Bibliography
 Goble, Alan. The Complete Index to Literary Sources in Film. Walter de Gruyter, 1999.

1897 births
1965 deaths
Italian male television actors
Italian male film actors
Italian male voice actors
People from Asti
20th-century Italian male actors